Sulejman Starova (born 12 December 1955) is an Albanian football coach and retired player.

Managerial career
As a manager, he has been in charge of his previous club Partizani Tirana as well as KF Tirana, Besa Kavajë and Teuta Durrës. He has also been technical director of Partizani, Teuta and FK Kukësi. On 10 February 2014 he was named as the manager of FK Kukësi following the departure of Naci Şensoy.

On 5 November 2017, Partizani Tirana announced on their official website that Starova will be the replacement of the sacked Mark Iuliano, starting the training on 7th. In September 2018, Starova was fired by Kosovan side Feronikeli after 12 matches in charge.

Managerial statistics

Director career
Starova was the General Secretary of the Albanian Football Association until 2004. On 17 June 2014, he was named the new sporting director of Partizani Tirana.

Honours
 as a player
Albanian Superliga: 2
 1979, 1981
 as a manager
Albanian Superliga: 1
 1993

References

1955 births
Living people
Footballers from Tirana
Albanian footballers
Albania under-21 international footballers
Association football defenders
KF Tirana players
FK Partizani Tirana players
Albanian football managers
FK Partizani Tirana managers
KF Tirana managers
KF Teuta Durrës managers
Besa Kavajë managers
FK Kukësi managers
KF Feronikeli managers
KF Laçi managers
Kategoria Superiore players
Kategoria Superiore managers
Albanian expatriate football managers
Expatriate football managers in Kosovo
Albanian expatriate sportspeople in Kosovo